The 1997 Israeli Labor Party leadership election was held on 3 June 1997 to elect the leader of the Israeli Labor Party. It saw the election of Ehud Barak.

Background
The leadership vote took place a year after Shimon Peres' narrow defeat in the 1996 Israeli prime ministerial election. After this defeat, Peres decided to not run for reelection as party leader.

Results 
69.2% of the 164,837 general party members that were eligible to vote participated in the election.

References

Israeli Labor Party leadership elections
Labor Party interim leadership election
Israeli Labor Party
June 1997 events in Asia